Darevskia uzzelli is a species of lizard in the family Lacertidae. The species is endemic to Turkey.

Etymology
The specific name, uzzelli, is in honor of American herpetologist Thomas Marshall Uzzell, Jr. (born 1932).

Geographic range
D. uzzelli is found northeastern Turkey. The type locality is Kars, Turkey.

Habitat

Reproduction
D. uzzelli reproduces by parthenogenesis.

References

Further reading
Darevsky I, Danielyan FD (1977). "[Lacerta uzzelli sp. nov. (Sauria: Lacertidae) – new parthenogenetic species of rock lizard from eastern Turkey]". [Trudy Zoological Institute, Leningrad ] 76: 55–59. (Lacerta uzzelli, new species). (in Russian).
Sindaco R, Jeremčenko VK (2008). The Reptiles of the Western Palearctic. 1. Annotated Checklist and Distributional Atlas of the Turtles, Crocodiles, Amphisbaenians and Lizards of Europe, North Africa, Middle East and Central Asia. (Monographs of the Societas Herpetologica Italica). Latina, Italy: Edizioni Belvedere. 580 pp. .
Tuniyev BS, Tuniyev SB, Avci A, Ilgaz Ç (2014). "[Herpetological research in eastern and northeastern Turkey]". [Modern Herpetology] 14 (1/2): 44–53. (in Russian).

Darevskia
Reptiles described in 1977
Reptiles of Turkey
Endemic fauna of Turkey
Taxa named by Ilya Darevsky
Taxa named by Felix D. Danielyan